"Smoke from a Distant Fire" is a song by American duo Sanford-Townsend Band. It was released as a single in 1977 from their self-titled album.

The song peaked at No. 9 on the Billboard Hot 100 on the week ending September 17, 1977, becoming the duo's only Top 40 hit.

Chart performance

See also
List of one-hit wonders in the United States

References

1977 songs
1977 singles
Warner Records singles